The Baylor Bears men's basketball team represents Baylor University in Waco, Texas, in NCAA Division I men's basketball competition. The Bears compete in the Big 12 Conference. The team plays its home games in Ferrell Center and is currently coached by Scott Drew.

History

Early years

Luther Burleson coached the first basketball team at Baylor in 1907 also doubling as the football coach. In Baylor's second season of basketball then cross-town rival TCU began their program which the Bears defeated twice during the 1908–09 season. Ralph Glaze's (1911–1914) .788 winning percentage ranks at the best all time in school history. Ralph Wolf (1927–1941) led Baylor to its first SWC Championship in 1932 after surviving and overcoming one of the first great tragedies in college athletics in his first season as coach.

Immortal Ten

On January 22, 1927, Coach Ralph Wolf's Baylor basketball team was traveling by bus to play the University of Texas. As the bus passed through Round Rock, Texas, it approached railroad tracks on the south side of the business district on a drizzly, cloudy day. As the bus crossed the tracks, the occupants failed to hear the sound of the train whistle and ringing bell. The driver caught sight of the train at the last moment and tried to steer away, but the Sunshine Special crashed into the bus at nearly 60 mph tearing off the roof and right side.

Ten Baylor students and basketball players were killed by the impact. One player, James Clyde "Abe" Kelly, pushed his friend, Weir Washam, out the window of the bus just moments before the impact, saving Washam's life but costing Kelly his own. The bodies of Kelly and Robert Hailey were found horrifically stretched across the cow-catcher on the front of the train, with arms locked around each other and Kelly missing a leg. Ivy Foster Sr. of Taylor, Texas, had heard of the accident and rushed to the train station in Taylor to meet the train and assist where needed only to find his son among the dead.

The deceased were Jack Castellaw, Sam Dillow, Merle Dudley, L. R. "Ivey" Foster Jr., Robert "Bob" Hailey, James Clyde "Abe" Kelly, Willis Murrary, James "Jim" Walker, and William Winchester.

The remainder of the 1927 season was canceled. The tragedy had reverberations over the entire state and nation and led to the construction of the first railway overpass in Texas where the event occurred at Round Rock. Buses were later required to come to a full stop and open the door at all rail crossings to listen for trains. The Immortal Ten story has been commemorated each year since 1927 at first in Chapel services then later at the Freshman Mass Meeting during Homecoming Week. In 2007, the event was also memorialized in bronze on the Baylor campus in Traditions Plaza.

On the 90th anniversary of the tragedy, January 22, 2017, the City of Round Rock held a memorial event to remember those who were killed in the train-bus collision. At the event, the city dedicated the "Immortal Bridge," which arcs over the railroad tracks where the accident occurred. Green lampposts, green-and-gold striping and other markings were added to honor the 10 students who were killed there. The event was open to the public, and attendees included Baylor administrators and student leaders, the spirit squads, and Baylor's Golden Wave Band.

Post-World War II success
Baylor men's teams won five conference championships in the former Southwest Conference (1932, 1946, 1948, 1949*, 1950*; * denotes shared title). The Bears reached the NCAA Tournament for the first time in 1946, and reached the Final Four in 1948 and 1950. Bill Henderson's 1948 team advanced to play the Kentucky Wildcats for the NCAA championship, but fell 58–42 to Adolph Rupp's first national championship team. The team again advanced to the NCAA Final Four in 1950 under Henderson losing to the Bradley Braves 68–66. Bill Menefee (1962–1973) would lead the Bears to a national ranking in 1969 but failed to make the postseason that year. Menefee was the only coach over the next 50 years to have a career record of over .500, and would later serve as Baylor's athletic director in the 1980s. Gene Iba's 1988 NCAA Tournament team would be the first NCAA Tournament appearance for the program in 38 years.

2003 scandal

The men's basketball program was plagued by a scandal in 2003. Patrick Dennehy, a player for the team, was murdered by former teammate Carlton Dotson; then-coach Dave Bliss was forced to resign amidst allegations that he had violated NCAA rules by making financial payments to four players and that he made improper statements to the media characterizing Dennehy as a drug dealer. The school placed itself on probation, limited itself to 7 scholarships for two years and imposed a post-season ban for one year. Additionally, the NCAA further punished the team by initiating a non-conference ban for the 2005–06 season and extending the probationary period during which the school would have limited recruiting privileges.

Recent resurgence
Thanks to the scandal, the 2005 Bears were hindered by only having 7 scholarship players and recorded only one win in conference play. From 2003 to 2007, the Bears would only win a total of 36 games. In spite of these challenges, head coach Scott Drew was able to put together a 2005 signing class ranked No. 7 nationally by HoopScoop.

However, Drew engineered a very quick return to respectability. In 2008, the Bears reached the NCAA Tournament for the first time in 20 years with a 9–7 conference record and the team's first national ranking in 39 years. The January 23, 2008 116–110 5OT win over Texas A&M at College Station officially became the longest game in Big 12 history. The 2008–09 team again was ranked early in the season but stumbled to a 5–11 conference finish before heating up in the Big 12 Tournament defeating both Kansas and Texas en route to the championship game versus Missouri, and lost by a score of 73–60. The 2008–09 team recorded the program's first postseason victory since 1950 in its first round NIT victory over the Georgetown Hoyas in Waco.

The 2008–09 team went on to advance to the NIT Final where they fell to Penn State. The 2009–10 squad was again ranked in both polls and pulled off the biggest road win in school history over the then #6 Texas Longhorns in Austin 80–77 on Jan. 30th. The Bears closed out the season with a Big 12 era best 11–5 record and #3 seed in the Big 12 Tournament.

The 2009–10 team was picked to finish 10th in the Big 12 in the Big 12 Coaches Poll due to the graduation of several key players from the previous year. However, the team finished the regular season 23–6 and tied for 2nd in the Big 12 standings. Following a 2–1 record at the Big 12 tournament, the Bears were rewarded with a #3 seed in the South Region of the NCAA Tournament. The Bears defeated #14 seed Sam Houston State 68–59 in First Round action and then defeated #11 seed Old Dominion 76–68 in Second Round play to advance to the Sweet 16 hosted at Reliant Stadium in Houston. The Bears' Sweet 16 match-up was #10 seed Saint Mary's, which had defeated #2 seed Villanova the previous week to advance to the Sweet 16. The Bears won handily over the Gaels, 72–49, after leading 47–19 at the half. The Elite Eight was also held at Reliant Stadium and the Bears' opponent was the #1 seed Duke Blue Devils, the last #1 seed standing in the NCAA Tournament after the other three #1 seeds (Kansas, Syracuse, and Kentucky) were all defeated by lower seeded teams. In front of a very pro-Baylor crowd of over 47,000, the Bears were defeated by the Duke Blue Devils, 78–71, to end the magical run to the Elite Eight. It was the best season in the Scott Drew era as defined by conference standing, overall ranking, wins, and NCAA Tournament wins. The Bears finished the season ranked #10 in the final ESPN/Coaches Poll—the highest ranking in program history at that time.

The 2010–11 team started the season ranked 14th (according to the AP Preseason poll). The Bears began 7–0, and rose to 9th in the polls before falling to Gonzaga at a neutral court in Dallas. The team finished 18–13 overall and 7–9 in league play. The highlight of the season was LaceDarius Dunn becoming the Big 12's all-time leading scorer, and a sweep of the series versus ranked Texas A&M. After freshman star Perry Jones III was suspended by the NCAA for six games, the Bears proceeded to lose their first-round game of the Big 12 Tournament against Oklahoma.

The 2012 season saw another historic campaign for the Bears as they followed up the 2011 season with another successful conference run which saw the Bears win 30 games and make it to the Big 12 tournament title game, but eventually losing to the Missouri Tigers. The Bears were selected for the NCAA Tournament and made it all the way to the Elite Eight, which ended in a loss to eventual national champion Kentucky.

The 2013 season witnesses another winning campaign for the Bears as they followed up the 2012 Elite Eight season with another successful conference run which saw the Bears sweep both TCU and Texas Tech while only dropping one game to UT.  The Bears started out with a pre-season ranking of #19 in the country. The Bears finish conference play at .500 and were selected for the NIT tournament. The Bears made it all the way to the final, which ended in a win over Iowa, winning the tournament before a large crowd in Madison Square Garden and claiming the 2013 NIT Title.

The 2016–17 season saw one of the best starts in Baylor history, going 15–0 with wins over #4 Oregon, #24 Michigan State, #10 Louisville, and #7 Xavier. On January 10, Baylor would reach AP #1 for the first time in program history. They would unfortunately would fall to #10 West Virginia that same day. Baylor remained within the top 12 for the remainder of the season and would finish 25–6, 12–6 in conference. They would fall to Iowa State in the first round of the Big 12 Tournament and receive a #3 seed in the 2017 NCAA tournament. Baylor would get to the Sweet Sixteen before being eliminated by South Carolina.

The 2019–20 season is considered one of the greatest in program history. They came into the season ranked 16th in the nation, but would fall to 24 after losing to Washington in the Armed Forces Classic. This would be their only loss in 105 days (their next loss was February 22) as the Bears would go on a 23-game win streak with 6 ranked victories as well. On January 11, Baylor would defeat #3 Kansas on the road, winning in Lawrence for the first time in school history. Baylor's impressive start to the season ended on a more sour note, losing 3 of their last 5 games before the Big 12 tournament. Baylor would finish the regular season 26–4 with a 15–3 conference mark, the most wins they've recorded in conference play and stayed ranked within the top 5 from the beginning of 2020 to the end. The NCAA Tournament, however, would be cancelled amid the COVID-19 pandemic.

In 2021, with the Bears’ help of soon-to-be consensus All-American Jared Butler, Baylor defeated Hartford, Wisconsin, Villanova, and Arkansas to reach their first Final Four since 1950, where they defeated the in-state Houston Cougars, to reach the NCAA championship, where they defeated Gonzaga, winning their first title in school history, and spoiling the Bulldogs’ then-perfect season in the process.

Facilities

In its early days, Marrs McLean Gym was Baylor’s basketball home, and doubled as the site of many physical education classes. Marrs McLean Gymnasium was built in 1938 and still stands on campus today.

The Heart O' Texas Fair Complex, now known as the Extraco Events Center, is located in Waco, Texas. It was once the prime basketball facility for Baylor University and was used from 1953 to 1988. The H.O.T Coliseum was constructed after McLennan County voters authorized a bond issue of $1.2 million in the early 1950s.

Since 1988, the Bears have played their home games at the Ferrell Center, adjacent to the Brazos River. It is named for Charles R. Ferrell, a Baylor student and legacy who died in 1967, and whose family's estate was a major benefactor of the arena. The main arena, Paul J. Meyer Arena, seats 10,284 people.

Coaching records

NCAA national championships

Season-by-season results

Postseason results

NCAA tournament results
The Bears have appeared in the NCAA tournament 15 times. Their combined record is 22–15.

NIT results
The Bears have appeared in the National Invitation Tournament (NIT) six times. Their combined record is 10–5. They were NIT champions in 2013.

Old Fight
Old Fight refers to the Baylor fight song, enacted in the mid 1950s.

All-time series records

All-time series records against Big 12 members
Baylor men's basketball all-time series against all Big 12 Conference opponents as of the beginning of the 2019–2020 season.

In series against conference opponents since the advent of the Big 12, Baylor leads TCU, Texas Tech, and West Virginia.

Players

All-Americans

Career scoring leaders
Records as of the 2021–22 season

See also
 NCAA Men's Division I Final Four appearances by coaches

Footnotes

References 

2014–15 Baylor Men's Basketball Media Almanac

External links